Jonathan Benyamin Markovitch (born 21 October 1967) is the chief Rabbi of Kyiv, official representative of Lubavitcher Rebbe Menachem Mendel Schneerson and the official Rabbi of the country's prisons.

Biography 
Jonathan Benyamin Markovitch was born in 1967 in Uzhhorod (Ukraine), to a rabbinical family. His maternal grandfather (Rabbi Yehezkel Fiyvel Ostraicher) served as the rabbi in (Uzhhorod) and Schochet in the city.

When he was 3 years old, he immigrated to Israel with his family. As a child, he studied in the school and yeshiva of Chabad in the city of Kiryat Gat. He continued his studies at Yeshiva Kfar Ganim, under the auspices of Rabbi Zucker.

In 1986 he enlisted in the Israeli Air Force, after 12 years of special service he was discharged to the reserve with the rank of major.

Education 

Rabbi Markovitch received rabbinical ordination from Rav Ovadia Yosef, the Sephardic Chief Rabbi of Israel 

He has a rabbinic status certificate from the Chief Rabbinate of Israel and has also been verified and received rabbinical ordination from Rabbi Eliyahu Aberjel, Rabbi of Safed, Rabbi Levi Bistritsky, Rabbi Yitzhak Yehuda Yaroslavsky of the Israeli Chabad Rabbinical Court, and the Chief Rabbinate of the Israeli Army.

In addition to his extensive Torah studies, he holds a bachelor's degree in equipment and control from the Technion and also a master's degree in education from the Hebrew University in Jerusalem.

Rabbi Markovitch was awarded the title of diploma of the European Parliament. He is revered by the European Union and received an honorary award for 2018 from the Ukrainian Bar Association.

Chief Rabbi of Kyiv 

In 2000, Rabbi Markovitch and his family moved to Kyiv. They founded educational institutions and a community.

His wife, Elka Inna, is the director of the network of institutions Or Avner in Kyiv, founded by Lev Leviev. The network includes kindergartens and schools. In addition, a kindergarten has been created for children with autism during off-hours and extensive events are held for the Jewish population and the city's population.

Hundreds of elderly and needy people regularly visit homes, hold social events, eat for food, medicine and hot meals. Dozens of young people are involved in social activities.

Hundreds of elderly and needy people regularly receive help - hot food, food kits, medicines, things.  They take part in public events and are regularly visited at home. Young people from the Jewish community are also involved in community activities.

In March 2020, Rabbi Markovich Helped the Ukrainian government to provide help to Ukraine in connection with the COVID-19 pandemic.

Rabbi Markovich is the chief Rabbi of Kyiv and the emissary of the Chabad movement. He is a very respected figure in Ukraine, by the Jewish and non-Jewish communities.  The Rabbi is known for his good relations with Ukrainian government figures and key figures in the Jewish world.

Awards 

Order of Merit of the III degree for significant personal contribution to state building, socio-economic, scientific and technical, cultural and educational development of Ukraine, significant labor achievements and high professionalism.

Family 
He is married to Elka Inna Markovich, who is the director of the network of institutions Or Avner. They have seven children.

References

Sources 
 Chabad-Lubavitch (Kyiv)
 Official page on Chabad-Lubavitch (Kyiv) website

1967 births
Chabad-Lubavitch rabbis
Living people
Clergy from Uzhhorod
Ukrainian Orthodox rabbis
Ukrainian Haredi rabbis
Ukrainian Hasidic rabbis
Chief rabbis of cities
Rebbes of Lubavitch
Rebbes of Chabad
Chabad-Lubavitch Hasidim
21st-century Ukrainian rabbis
20th-century Ukrainian rabbis
Chabad-Lubavitch emissaries
Uzhhorod
kyiv